Shibani Dandekar Akhtar (born 27 August 1980) is an Indian-born Australian singer, actress, host and model. She began her career working as a television host on American television. Following her return to India, she began hosting several shows and events on Hindi television, besides working as a model and singer. She was one of the co-hosts of the 2019 ICC Cricket World Cup. She was also a contestant on Jhalak Dikhhla Jaa 5 (2012) and Fear Factor: Khatron Ke Khiladi 8 (2017).

Early and personal life

Dandekar was born in Pune as the eldest daughter into a Marathi family. Her father Shashidhar Dandekar is a theatre actor in Australia and her mother Sulabha Dandekar works in Qantas Airways, Australia. She has two sisters, Anusha Dandekar, an actress-singer working in Bollywood, and Apeksha Dandekar. Dandekar along with her sisters formed a music band named D-Major. Dandekar grew up in Australia and Africa for the majority of her childhood.

Dandekar started dating Bollywood filmmaker and actor Farhan Akhtar in 2018, just after his divorce from Adhuna Bhabani in 2017. On 19 February 2022, they got married in a non-religious ceremony at Farhan's father's farmhouse in Khandala.

Career
In 2001, she moved to New York City and began working in American television. She hosted three nationally syndicated television shows, Namaste America, V Desi and the Asian Variety Show. In this role, she introduced Bollywood's biggest stars to American audiences and also hosted An Evening With Shah Rukh Khan in Atlantic City. She has been a contestant on Jhalak Dikhhla Jaa, the India-based Dancing With the Stars on the BBC network and hosted in India on Colors TV.

She returned to India and continued her work as a television host, while venturing into modelling as well. 

Apart from music and modeling, Dandekar's love for anchoring shows saw her as host for major events such as the Maxim Hot 100, Nike, Rolls-Royce, Puma, Mercedes, Toyota, Horlicks, HSBC, Spice Mobile, JBL, MTV Coke Studio, Nivea and the Sony Launch of the tribute to Michael Jackson's "This is It". Dandekar has anchored popular shows including the lifestyle shows After Hours on Zee Cafe, Men 2.0 on AXN, ZoOm's Let's Design, India's Sexiest Bachelor on Big CBS Prime, as well as its extension India's Glam Diva on Big CBS Love. Dandekar also anchored the Indian produced Grammy Nominees Special on VH1 as a lead-up to the 53rd Grammy Awards. Since 2011, she has been co-hosting the show Extraa Innings – T20 on Sony Max Television during the Indian Premier League matches; she won a nomination at the 11th Indian Television Academy Awards in the category Best Anchor Game/Quiz Show. She is hosting the Mission cover shot for National Geography channel. She did a dance number Hi Poli Saajuk  for 2014's Marathi movie Timepass, followed by 36 Nakhrewali in Sangharsh. She played the role 'Zoya' in the movie Roy which was released on 13 February 2015. In 2017, Shibani participated in Khatron Ke Khiladi 8 and eliminated in the first week at 12th place. In 2019, she hosted the opening ceremony of ICC Cricket World Cup 2019 along with Andrew Flintoff and Paddy McGuinness in which her husband Farhan Akhtar also appeared as a guest representing India.

Filmography

Film

Television

References

External links

 
 

Living people
Actresses from Pune
Female models from Maharashtra
Marathi people
Indian film actresses
Indian women singers
Indian female models
Indian emigrants to Australia
Actresses from Sydney
Australian film actresses
Australian women singers
Australian female models
Australian women television presenters
Australian VJs (media personalities)
Australian people of Marathi descent
Australian people of Indian descent
Australian actresses of Indian descent
Australian expatriate actresses in India
Actresses in Marathi cinema
Actresses in Hindi cinema
Actresses in Telugu cinema
Actresses in Malayalam cinema
Fear Factor: Khatron Ke Khiladi participants
21st-century Australian actresses
21st-century Australian singers
21st-century Australian women singers
1980 births